Young Africans Sports Club, commonly referred as Yanga  is a Tanzanian professional football club based in Jangwani, Dar es Salaam, Tanzania. Founded in 1935, the club play their home games at the Benjamin Mkapa Stadium.

Nicknamed "Yanga" (Young Boys), the club has won 28 league titles and number of domestic cups, and have participated in multiple CAF Champions League editions. They have won the CECAFA Club Championship five times.

The club became a symbol of the anti-colonial movement. Young Africans became associated with nationalists and freedom fighters, and inspired the political party TANU to adopt yellow and green as their primary colours. The club is currently in a process that will keep the club ownership 49% for investors and the rest 51% to the club members.

The club holds a long-standing rivalry with their cross-city rivals Simba, whom they contest the Dar es Salaam (better known as Kariakoo) derby. The rivalry was ranked 5th as one of the most famous African derbies.

History
The club's roots can be traced as far back as 1910s, but the officially recognised history of the club started in 1935 when Dar es Salaam residents, who were grouped as Africans by the colonial administration in Tanganyika, decided to form a football club to compete in a league which was full of "non-African" football clubs. The name New Young is said to be the club's first name. Later it was replaced by the name Dar es Salaam Young Africans SC, and eventually the name changed to Young Africans Sports Club.

After its establishment in 1935, its members squabbled over their team's poor performance and results. The club had an even poorer and unsatisfactory performance in 1936 that caused some of the members to split and form another team. The proponents of breaking away were Arabs who saw fit to cause conflict among the club members that led to a split. They succeeded, and together with dissidents formed a club known as Queens F.C. (currently Simba). The two teams, Young Africans and Simba, have been rivals ever since. 

In 2020 Yanga signed a consultancy deal with La Liga. On May 27, the members of the club agreed to change their club's ruling structure to allow private investments from other companies.

Colours and badge

Players

Current squad

Out on loan

Honours

Domestic 

Tanzanian Premier League
 Champions (28): 1968, 1969, 1970, 1971, 1972, 1974, 1981, 1983, 1985,1987, 1989, 1991, 1992, 1993, 1996, 1997, 1998, 2002, 2005, 2006, 2007–08, 2008–09, 2010–11, 2012–13, 2014–15, 2015–16, 2016–17, 2021–22

Nyerere Cup
 Champions (3): 1975, 1994, 1999
Runners-up (1): 2001

FAT Cup

 Champions (2): 2015–16, 2021/22
 Runners-up (1): 1996, 2021

Tusker Cup

 Champions (7):1986,1992,1987,2000,2005,2007, 2009
 Runners-up (3): 2001, 2002, 2005.  

  
Mapinduzi Cup  
                                            
 Champions (3): 2003,2004, 2021
 Runners-up (1): 2011

Community Shield

 Champions (8): 2001, 2010, 2013, 2014, 2015, 2021,2022
 Runners-up (6): 2002, 2005,2013,2009, 2011, 2016, 2017

Continental 
CECAFA Club Championship
 Champions (5): 1975, 1993, 1999, 2011, 2012
Runners-up (3): 1976, 1986, 1992

Performance in CAF competitions
CAF Champions League: 15 appearances 

1997 – Preliminary Round
1998 – Group stage (Top 8)
2001 – Second Round
2006 – Preliminary Round
2007 – Second Round
2009 – First Round
2010 – Preliminary Round
2012 – Preliminary Round
2014 – First Round
2016 – Second Round
2017 – First Round

2022 – First Round 
2023 – 
 African Cup of Champions Clubs: 11 appearances

1969 – Quarter-finals
1970 – Quarter-finals
1971 – withdrew in Second Round
1972 – First Round
1973 – First Round
1975 – Second Round
1982 – Second Round
1984 – First Round
1988 – First Round
1992 – First Round
1996 – Preliminary Round

CAF Confederation Cup: 5 appearances

2007 – Intermediate Round
2008 – First Round
2011 – Preliminary Round
2016 – Group stage (Top 8)
2018 – Group stage (Top 16)

CAF Cup: 2 appearances
1994 – First Round
1999 – First Round

CAF Cup Winners' Cup: 2 appearances
1995 – Quarter-finals
2000 – First Round

References

 
Sport in Dar es Salaam
1935 establishments in Tanganyika
Association football clubs established in 1935